Munguia or Munguía is a surname. Notable people with the surname include:

Alma Lilia Luna Munguía (born 1976), Mexican politician 
Antonio Munguía (1942–2018), Mexican footballer
Carolina Malpica Munguía (1891–1977), American educator and community activist
Jaime Munguia (born 1996), Mexican boxer 
José Luis Munguía (1959–1985), Salvadoran footballer
Juan Manuel Sandoval Munguia (born 1966), Mexican politician
Julio Munguía (born 1942), Mexican cyclist
Lourdes Munguía (born 1960), Mexican actress
Miguel Ángel Luna Munguía (1969–2015), Mexican politician
Ricardo Munguía Padilla (1944–2007), Mexican footballer
Ricardo Munguía Pérez (born 1975), Mexican footballer
Roberto José d'Aubuisson Munguía (born 1968), Salvadoran politician

See also
Meanings of minor planet names: 23001–24000#079